Guard 13 is a 1946 Czech crime film directed by Martin Frič.

Cast
 Dana Medřická as Frantiska Brabcová aka Fróny
 Jaroslav Marvan as Inspektor Cadek
 Ella Nollová as Matka Klouzanda, hospodská
 Vilém Pfeiffer as MUDr. Karel Chrudimský
 Nora Cífková as Hlavsová, snoubenka Chrudimského
 Miloš Nedbal as Komisar Dr. Barák
 Blanka Waleská as Wang - Liová
 Jaroslav Sára as Wang-li, cínský podomní obchodník
 Ladislav H. Struna as Karta, kasar
 Alois Dvorský as Hlas kartova otce
 Vladimír Repa as Draboch, detektiv
 Otto Rubík as Pobozný, detektiv
 Vladimír Leraus as Docent patologie
 Vladimír Hlavatý as Jindra, císník
 Anna Gabrielová as Prostitute

References

External links
 

1946 films
1946 crime films
1940s Czech-language films
Czechoslovak black-and-white films
Films directed by Martin Frič
Czech crime films
Czechoslovak crime films
1940s Czech films